Peddapalli Lok Sabha constituency is one of the 17 Lok Sabha (Lower House of the Parliament) constituencies in Telangana state in southern India. This constituency is reserved for the candidates belonging to the Scheduled castes

Overview
Since its inception in 1962 Peddapalli seat is a Congress  stronghold, various political outfits like the Telangana Praja Samithi and the Telugu Desam Party have won it during different general elections.

After the formation of Telangana the Telangana Rashtra Samithi won the seat for the first time in 2014 General Election.

Assembly segments
Peddapalli Lok Sabha constituency presently comprises the following Legislative Assembly segments:

Members of Parliament

Election results

General Election, 2019

General Election, 2014

General Election, 2009

General Election, 2004

Trivia
 The Lok Sabha constituency includes three assembly constituencies from Adilabad district i.e. Chennur, Bellampalli,  Mancherial
  G. Venkat Swamy, former Union Minister represented the constituency in Ninth, Tenth, Eleventh and Fourteenth Lok Sabha respectively.

See also
 Karimnagar district
 List of Constituencies of the Lok Sabha

References

Lok Sabha constituencies in Telangana
Karimnagar district
Adilabad district